Alan Brinley Rees (born 12 January 1938 in Langstone, Newport, Monmouthshire) is a British former racing driver from Wales.  He participated in three World Championship Grands Prix in the 1960s, although two of those appearances were driving Formula 2 cars. He scored no championship points. His best result was seventh place (second in the Formula Two class) in the 1967 German Grand Prix.

Rees drove for the works Lotus Formula Junior team in 1962, and won three races before a crash at the Nürburgring 1000 km sports car race ended his season. From 1963 to 1968, he drove for the Roy Winklemann Racing team in Formula Two and frequently achieved victories over experienced drivers such as Jackie Stewart and Jochen Rindt.

Formula One team management 
In 1969 Rees co-founded March Engineering; his initials being the "AR" in "March", alongside Max Mosley, Graham Coaker and Robin Herd. At the end of 1971 he moved to a Shadow Racing Cars where he became team principal. In 1977 he left Shadow to co-found Arrows. In 1996 he and the other remaining founders sold Arrows to Tom Walkinshaw. Following the death of Max Mosley in 2021, he is the sole March co-founder still alive.

Complete Formula One World Championship results
(key)

References

Welsh racing drivers
Welsh Formula One drivers
Cooper Formula One drivers
Formula One team owners
European Formula Two Championship drivers
1938 births
Living people
Sportspeople from Newport, Wales
24 Hours of Le Mans drivers
World Sportscar Championship drivers
English motorsport people
Arrows Grand Prix International